A seven-segment display is a form of electronic display device for displaying decimal numerals that is an alternative to the more complex dot matrix displays.

Seven-segment displays are widely used in digital clocks, electronic meters, basic calculators, and other electronic devices that display numerical information.

History
Seven-segment representation of figures can be found in patents as early as 1903 (in ), when Carl Kinsley invented a method of telegraphically transmitting letters and numbers and having them printed on tape in a segmented format. In 1908, F. W. Wood invented an 8-segment display, which displayed the number 4 using a diagonal bar. In 1910, a seven-segment display illuminated by incandescent bulbs was used on a power-plant boiler room signal panel. They were also used to show the dialed telephone number to operators during the transition from manual to automatic telephone dialing. They did not achieve widespread use until the advent of LEDs in the 1970s. 

Some early seven-segment displays used incandescent filaments in an evacuated bulb; they are also known as numitrons. A variation (minitrons) made use of an evacuated potted box. Minitrons are filament segment displays that are housed in DIP packages like modern LED segment displays. They may have up to 16 segments. There were also segment displays that used small incandescent light bulbs instead of LEDs or incandescent filaments. These worked similarly to modern LED segment displays.

Vacuum fluorescent display versions were also used in the 1970s.

Many early (c. 1970s) LED seven-segment displays had each digit built on a single die. This made the digits very small. Some included magnifying lenses onto the design in an attempt to make the digits more legible.

The seven-segment pattern is sometimes used in posters or tags, where the user either applies color to pre-printed segments, or applies color through a seven-segment digit template, to compose figures such as product prices or telephone numbers.

For many applications, dot-matrix LCDs have largely superseded LED displays in general, though even in LCDs, seven-segment displays are common. Unlike LEDs, the shapes of elements in an LCD panel are arbitrary since they are formed on the display by photolithography. In contrast, the shapes of LED segments tend to be simple rectangles, reflecting the fact that they have to be physically moulded to shape, which makes it difficult to form more complex shapes than the segments of 7-segment displays. However, the high recognition factor of seven-segment displays, and the comparatively high visual contrast obtained by such displays relative to dot-matrix digits, makes seven-segment multiple-digit LCD screens very common on basic calculators.

The seven-segment display has inspired type designers to produce typefaces reminiscent of that display (but more legible), such as New Alphabet, "DB LCD Temp", "ION B", etc.

Using a restricted range of letters that look like (upside-down) digits, seven-segment displays are commonly used by school children to form words and phrases using a technique known as "calculator spelling".

Implementations 

Seven-segment displays may use a liquid crystal display (LCD), a light-emitting diode (LED) for each segment, an electrochromic display, or other light-generating or controlling techniques such as cold cathode gas discharge (Panaplex), vacuum fluorescent (VFD), incandescent filaments (Numitron), and others. For gasoline price totems and other large signs, vane displays made up of electromagnetically flipped light-reflecting segments (or "vanes") are still commonly used. A precursor to the 7-segment display in the 1950s through the 1970s was the cold-cathode, neon-lamp-like nixie tube. Starting in 1970, RCA sold a display device known as the  that used incandescent filaments arranged into a seven-segment display. In USSR, the first electronic calculator "Vega", which was produced from 1964, contains 20 decimal digits with seven-segment electroluminescent display.

In a simple LED package, typically all of the cathodes (negative terminals) or all of the anodes (positive terminals) of the segment LEDs are connected and brought out to a common pin; this is referred to as a "common cathode" or "common anode" device. Hence a 7 segment plus decimal point package will only require nine pins, though commercial products typically contain more pins, and/or spaces where pins would go, in order to match standard IC sockets. Integrated displays also exist, with single or multiple digits. Some of these integrated displays incorporate their own internal decoder, though most do not: each individual LED is brought out to a connecting pin as described.

Multiple-digit LED displays as used in pocket calculators and similar devices used multiplexed displays to reduce the number of I/O pins required to control the display. For example, all the anodes of the A segments of each digit position would be connected together and to a driver circuit pin, while the cathodes of all segments for each digit would be connected. To operate any particular segment of any digit, the controlling integrated circuit would turn on the cathode driver for the selected digit, and the anode drivers for the desired segments; then after a short blanking interval the next digit would be selected and new segments lit, in a sequential fashion. In this manner an eight digit display with seven segments and a decimal point would require only 8 cathode drivers and 8 anode drivers, instead of sixty-four drivers and IC pins. Often in pocket calculators the digit drive lines would be used to scan the keyboard as well, providing further savings; however, pressing multiple keys at once would produce odd results on the multiplexed display.

Although to a naked eye all digits of an LED display appear lit, only one digit is lit at any given time in a multiplexed display. The digit changes at a high enough rate that the human eye cannot see the flashing (on earlier devices it could be visible to peripheral vision).

Characters

The seven segments are arranged as a rectangle of two vertical segments on each side with one horizontal segment on the top, middle, and bottom. Often the rectangle is oblique (slanted), which aids readability. In most applications, the segments are of nearly uniform shape and size (usually elongated hexagons, though trapezoids and rectangles can also be used), though in the case of adding machines, the vertical segments are longer and more oddly shaped at the ends in an effort to further enhance readability. The seven elements of the display can be lit in different combinations to represent the Arabic numerals.

The segments are referred to by the letters A to G, where the optional decimal point (an "eighth segment", referred to as DP) is used for the display of non-integer numbers. A single byte can encode the full state of a 7-segment-display including the decimal point. The most popular bit encodings are gfedcba and abcdefg. In the gfedcba representation, a byte value of 0x06 would turn on segments "c" and "b", which would display a "1".

Decimal
The numerical digits 0 to 9 are the most common characters displayed on seven-segment displays. The most common patterns used for each of these is:

         

Alternate patterns: The numeral 1 may be represented with the left segments, the numerals 6 and 9 may be represented without a "tail", and the numeral 7 represented with a 'tail':

   

In Unicode 13.0, 10 codepoints had been given for segmented digits 0–9 in the Symbols for Legacy Computing block, to replicate early computer fonts that included seven-segment versions of the digits. The official reference shows the less-common four-segment "7". The characters as displayed by your browser:

Hexadecimal
Four binary bits are needed to specify the numbers 0–9, but can also specify 10–15, so usually decoders with 4 bit inputs can also display Hexadecimal (Hex) digits. Today, a combination of uppercase and lowercase letters is commonly used for A–F; this is done to obtain a unique, unambiguous shape for each hexadecimal digit (otherwise, a capital "D" would look identical to a '0' and a capital 'B' would look identical to an '8'). Also the digit '6' must be displayed with the top bar lit to avoid ambiguity with the letter 'b'.

Letters
Most letters of the Latin alphabet can be reasonably implemented using seven segments.  Though not every letter is available, it is possible to create many useful words.  By choosing better synonyms, it is possible to work around many shortcomings of seven-segment alphabet encodings. Some uppercase letters ('I', "O", "S", "Z") look identical to numerical digits ('1', '0', '5', '2'), though it is possible to use lower-case "o" and "i", or putting "I" on the left. Lowercase letters "b" and "q" are identical to the alternate numerical digits '6' and '9'. Depending on the situation, some of these problem characters can be used when no numeric values are used in the same word/phrase, see examples below.

Short messages giving status information (e.g. "" on a CD player) are also commonly represented on 7-segment displays. In the case of such messages it is not necessary for every letter to be unambiguous, merely for the words as a whole to be readable.

Examples:

Seven-segment displays have also been used to show letters of the Cyrillic and Greek alphabets:

There are enough patterns to show all the letters but few representations are unambiguous and intuitive at the same time. When all letters need to be displayed on a device, sixteen-segment and dot matrix displays are better choices than seven-segment displays.

Punctuation
Seven segments are capable of displaying some punctuation glyph characters.  The hex value for each Unicode character is shown.

Decoder ICs
In the past, some seven-segment decoder ICs didn't output the following modern decimal/hexadecimal font.
{|
| 
| 
| 
| 
| 
| 
| 
| 
| 
| 
| 
| 
| 
| 
| 
| 
|}

 For "1", the MC14558B displays the number on the left side of the display using segments "e" and "f" instead of the usual "b" and "c".
 For "7", the TC5022 displays it with additional segment "f".
 For "6" and "9", the CD4511B, MC14558B, TC5002, SN74x46/SN74x47/SN74x48/SN74x49 displays both numbers without a "tail", where "x" is the TTL logic family.
 For "A" to "F":
 BCD decoder ICs support various seven-segment fonts for their decoded output of "A" (10) to "F" (15) inputs.
 The 7446/7447/7448/7449 and the Siemens FLH551-7448/555-8448 chips used truncated versions of "2", "3", "4", "5" and "6" for digits A–E. Digit F (1111 binary) was blank.
 The TC5002 and TC5022 repeat the numbers 0 to 5 for digits A–F.
 The MM74C912 displayed "o" for A and B, "−" for C, D and E, and blank for F. The CD4511B just displayed blanks. 
 Soviet programmable calculators like the Б3–34 used the symbols "−", "L", "C", "Г", "E", and " " (space), allowing the error message EГГ0Г to be displayed.

{| class="wikitable nounderlines" style="text-align: center;"
|-
! Manufacturer || Part Number || Production || Description || 0 || 1 || 2 || 3 || 4 || 5 || 6 || 7 || 8 || 9 || A || B || C || D || E || F || Output || Datasheet

|-
| RCA
| CD4026B
| 
| BCD Counter, Up
| 
| 
| 
| 
| 
| 
| 
| 
| 
| 
| style="background-color:#CCCCCC;" | 
| style="background-color:#CCCCCC;" | 
| style="background-color:#CCCCCC;" | 
| style="background-color:#CCCCCC;" | 
| style="background-color:#CCCCCC;" | 
| style="background-color:#CCCCCC;" | 
| Active-High
| 

|-
| RCA
| CD4033B
| 
| BCD Counter, Up
| 
| 
| 
| 
| 
| 
| 
| 
| 
| 
| style="background-color:#CCCCCC;" | 
| style="background-color:#CCCCCC;" | 
| style="background-color:#CCCCCC;" | 
| style="background-color:#CCCCCC;" | 
| style="background-color:#CCCCCC;" | 
| style="background-color:#CCCCCC;" | 
| Active-High
| 

|-
| RCA
| CD40110B
| 
| BCD Counter, Up/Down
| 
| 
| 
| 
| 
| 
| 
| 
| 
| 
| style="background-color:#CCCCCC;" | 
| style="background-color:#CCCCCC;" | 
| style="background-color:#CCCCCC;" | 
| style="background-color:#CCCCCC;" | 
| style="background-color:#CCCCCC;" | 
| style="background-color:#CCCCCC;" | 
| Active-High
| 

|-
| RCA
| CD4511B
| 
| BCD Decoder, Latch
| 
| 
| 
| 
| 
| 
| 
| 
| 
| 
| 
| 
| 
| 
| 
| 
| Active-High
| 

|-
| RCA
| CD4543B
| 
| BCD Decoder, Latch
| 
| 
| 
| 
| 
| 
| 
| 
| 
| 
| 
| 
| 
| 
| 
| 
| Active-High or Low
| 

|-
| Motorola
| MC14495-1
| 
| Hex Decoder, Latch
| 
| 
| 
| 
| 
| 
| 
| 
| 
| 
| 
| 
| 
| 
| 
| 
| Active-High, 290Ω
| 

|-
| Motorola
| MC14558B
| 
| BCD Decoder
| 
| 
| 
| 
| 
| 
| 
| 
| 
| 
| 
| 
| 
| 
| 
| 
| Active-High
| 

|-
| TI
| SN74LS47
| 
| BCD Decoder
| 
| 
| 
| 
| 
| 
| 
| 
| 
| 
| 
| 
| 
| 
| 
| 
| Active-Low
| 

|-
| TI
| SN74LS247
| 
| BCD Decoder
| 
| 
| 
| 
| 
| 
| 
| 
| 
| 
| 
| 
| 
| 
| 
| 
| Active-Low
| 

|-
| Toshiba
| TC5002
| 
| BCD Decoder
| 
| 
| 
| 
| 
| 
| 
| 
| 
| 
| 
| 
| 
| 
| 
| 
| Active-High
| 

|-
| Toshiba
| TC5022
| 
| BCD Decoder
| 
| 
| 
| 
| 
| 
| 
| 
| 
| 
| 
| 
| 
| 
| 
| 
| Active-High
| 

|-
| National
| MM74C912
| 
| 6-Digit BCD Controller
| 
| 
| 
| 
| 
| 
| 
| 
| 
| 
| 
| 
| 
| 
| 
| 
| Active-High
| 

|-
| National
| MM74C917
| 
| 6-Digit Hex Controller
| 
| 
| 
| 
| 
| 
| 
| 
| 
| 
| 
| 
| 
| 
| 
| 
| Active-High
| 

|-
| National
| DM9368
| 
| Hex Decoder, Latch
| 
| 
| 
| 
| 
| 
| 
| 
| 
| 
| 
| 
| 
| 
| 
| 
| Active High, 25mA CC
| 

|-
| National
| DM9370
| 
| Hex Decoder, Latch
| 
| 
| 
| 
| 
| 
| 
| 
| 
| 
| 
| 
| 
| 
| 
| 
| Active Low, OC
| 

|-
| National
| DM9374
| 
| BCD Decoder, Latch
| 
| 
| 
| 
| 
| 
| 
| 
| 
| 
| 
| 
| 
| 
| 
| 
| Active Low, 15mA CC
| 

|}

See also

There are also fourteen- and sixteen-segment displays (for full alphanumerics); however, these have mostly been replaced by dot matrix displays. 22-segment displays capable of displaying the full ASCII character set were briefly available in the early 1980s but did not prove popular.

 Eight-segment display
 Nine-segment display
 Fourteen-segment display
 Sixteen-segment display
 Dot matrix display
 Nixie tube display
 Vacuum fluorescent display

References

External links

 Interactive Demonstration of a Seven Segment Display
 Interfacing Seven Segment Display to 8051 Microcontroller
 Interfacing 7 Segment Display with AVR Microcontroller

Display technology